Sandracottus festivus is a species of beetle in the family Dytiscidae.

References

Beetles described in 1802